Virginia's 28th House of Delegates district elects one of 100 seats in the Virginia House of Delegates, the lower house of the state's bicameral legislature. District 28 is located in Stafford County and Fredericksburg. The seat is currently held by Tara Durant.

District officeholders

Electoral history

2021

References

External links
 

Virginia House of Delegates districts
Stafford County, Virginia
Fredericksburg, Virginia